Yelena Piskunova (born 2 August 1980) is a Uzbekistani sprinter. She competed in the women's 400 metres at the 2000 Summer Olympics.

Biography 
Yelena Piskunova was born in the city of Samarkand, Uzbek SSR, on August 2, 1980. In 1999, at the Asian Junior Athletics Championships, she won silver in the 400 meters with a score of 54.43.

References

1980 births
Living people
Athletes (track and field) at the 2000 Summer Olympics
Uzbekistani female sprinters
Olympic athletes of Uzbekistan
People from Samarkand
Olympic female sprinters
21st-century Uzbekistani women